Kaluahi is a village in Madhubani District of Bihar in India. 

Which is so close to nepal

Country:- India

State:- Bihar

District:- Madhubani

Language:- maithili, Hindi, and little bit English

Timezone:- UTC+5:30 (IST)

Pincode:- 847229

Connectivity 
The distance from Kaluahi to Patna is 175 km. The nearest railway station is in Madhubani, and the nearest airport is Darbhanga Airport, Bihar. Kaluahi has a middle school, a kasturba balika school, and a TN. HIGH SCHOOL

Population 
Below are the villages and towns under Kaluahi block with their respective populations.

Constituency
Assembly constituency: Benipatti Vidhan Sabha

Sitting MLA (2020) : Vinod Narayan Jha (INC)

Parliament constituency : Madhubani

Sitting MP (2019) : Ashok Kumar Yadav (BJP)

Famous place

References

Darbhanga division
Villages in Madhubani district